Vitālijs Meļņičenko (born 11 November 1987 in Riga) is a Latvian footballer who plays for Lysekloster IL.

Club career

As a youth player Meļņičenko played for Rīgas Futbola skola, making his first professional appearance in 2005 for Olimps/RFS. In 2006, he joined FK Eirobaltija, but in 2007 he returned to the higher-level football, joining FK Rīga. Unable to prove himself there he was signed by Skonto Riga in 2008. He made 2 appearances for the club, being loaned to Olimps/RFS in 2008 and SK Blāzma in 2009. While playing for Olimps/RFS, Meļņičenko managed to score a goal against FK Vindava and all in all played 7 league games. During the loan spell at SK Blāzma he played 10 league matches. In 2010 Meļņičenko was given out on loan to Olimps/RFS yet again. Having played 3 matches for the club, Meļņičenko left for SK Blāzma once again in 2010.

At the start of 2011 Meļņičenko went on trial with the Nemzeti Bajnokság I club Zalaegerszegi TE in Hungary. The player did not stay in Zalaegerszeg, but eventually signed a contract with a different Hungarian club - the league newcomers Szolnoki MÁV in February 2011. In July 2011 he was released, having made 13 appearances in the top tier of Hungarian football. Meļņičenko remained unemployed until February 2012, when he was signed by that time Latvian champions FK Ventspils. Starting the season as the first-choice keeper, Meļņičenko appeared in 15 league matches, but was later replaced by Maksims Uvarenko. Meļņičenko played for Ventspils until the end of the 2013 season, mainly being used as the backup keeper.

In March 2014 Meļņičenko joined the Latvian Higher League club Spartaks Jūrmala. He played 23 league matches, keeping 11 clean sheets throughout the season. In January 2015 Meļņičenko was signed by his previous club FK Ventspils as a replacement for Uvarenko who had moved to CSKA Sofia.

In March 2020, Meļņičenko was signed by Norwegian club Lysekloster IL. However, he wasn't presented before June 2020. As of February 2022, he was still playing for the Norwegian club.

Honours

Skonto FC
Latvian Higher League - BRONZE
 2009

FK Ventspils
Latvian Higher League - BRONZE
 2012, 2015
Latvian Higher League - CHAMPION
 2013
Latvian Cup - WINNER
 2012-13
Latvian Cup - FINALIST
 2014–15, 2018
Latvian Higher League - SILVER
 2018

FK Spartaks
Latvian Higher League - CHAMPION
 2017

FC Fakel
League Cup - WINNER
 2017

References

 6. http://sportacentrs.com/futbols/citi_latvijas_turniri/28042015-melnicenko_ar_pendelu_atvairisanu_nekad_n
 7. http://sportacentrs.com/futbols/virsliga/13112015-melnicenko_pametis_ventspili_ligumi_pagar

External links 

 
 
 
 

1987 births
Living people
Footballers from Riga
Latvian footballers
Latvian people of Ukrainian descent
Latvian expatriate footballers
Association football goalkeepers
JFK Olimps players
Skonto FC players
SK Blāzma players
FK Rīga players
Szolnoki MÁV FC footballers
FK Ventspils players
FK Spartaks Jūrmala players
FC Fakel Voronezh players
FK RFS players
Expatriate footballers in Russia
Expatriate footballers in Hungary
Expatriate footballers in Norway
Latvian expatriate sportspeople in Russia
Latvian expatriate sportspeople in Hungary
Latvian expatriate sportspeople in Norway